Drepanidini is a tribe of cardueline finches containing the Hawaiian honeycreepers. It was formerly considered one of three Hawaiian honeycreeper tribes (the others being Hemignathini and Psittirostrini), and restricted to the genera Ciridops, Drepanis, Himatione, Melamprosops, and Palmeria, most of which are nectarivores with brightly-colored or boldly-patterned plumage and songs containing nasal squeaks and whistles. However, as these three tribes were each para- or polyphyletic, and as Hawaiian honeycreepers are no longer treated as their own subfamily or family, Drepanidini is now typically used for all Hawaiian honeycreepers.

Genera and species

 Drepanidini
 Genus Aidemedia Olson & James, 1991 – straight thin bills, insectivores
 Aidemedia chascax Olson & James, 1991 – Oʻahu icterid-like gaper (prehistoric)
 Aidemedia lutetiae Olson & James, 1991 – Maui Nui icterid-like gaper (prehistoric)
 Aidemedia zanclops Olson & James, 1991 – sickle-billed gaper (prehistoric)
 Genus Akialoa Olson & James, 1995 – pointed, long and down-curved bills, insectivorous or nectarivorous
 Akialoa ellisiana Gray, 1859 – Oʻahu ʻakialoa (extinct, 1940)
 Akialoa lanaiensis Rothschild, 1893 – Maui Nui ʻakialoa (extinct, 1892)
 Akialoa stejnegeri Wilson, 1889 – Kauaʻi ʻakialoa (extinct, 1969)
 Akialoa obscura Cabanis, 1889 – lesser ʻakialoa (extinct, 1940)
 Akialoa upupirostris – hoopoe-billed ʻakialoa (prehistoric)
 Genus Chloridops Wilson, 1888 – thick-billed, hard seed (e.g. Myoporum sandwicense) specialist
 Chloridops kona Wilson, 1888 – Kona grosbeak (extinct, 1894)
 Chloridops regiskongi – King Kong grosbeak (prehistoric)
 Chloridops wahi – wahi grosbeak (prehistoric)
 Genus Chlorodrepanis Olson & James, 1995 – pointed bills, insectivorous and nectarivorous
 Chlorodrepanis stejnegeri Pratt, 1989 – Kauaʻi ʻamakihi
 Chlorodrepanis flava Bloxam, 1827 – Oʻahu ʻamakihi
 Chlorodrepanis virens Cabanis, 1851 – Hawaiʻi ʻamakihi
 Genus Ciridops Newton, 1892 – finch-like, fed on fruit of Pritchardia species
 Ciridops anna Dole, 1879 – ʻula-ʻai-hāwane (extinct, 1892 or 1937)
 Ciridops tenax Olson & James, 1991 stout-legged finch (prehistoric)
 Genus Drepanis Temminck, 1820 – down-curved bills, nectarivores
 Drepanis funerea Newton, 1894 – black mamo (extinct, 1907)
 Drepanis pacifica Gmelin, 1788 – Hawaiʻi mamo (extinct, 1898)
 Drepanis coccinea Forster, 1780 – ʻiʻiwi
 Genus Dysmorodrepanis Perkins, 1919 – pincer-like bill, possibly snail specialist
 Dysmorodrepanis munroi Perkins, 1919 – Lanaʻi hookbill (extinct, 1918)
 Genus Hemignathus Lichtenstein, 1839 – pointed or long and down-curved bills, insectivorous
 Hemignathus affinis – Maui nukupuʻu (extinct, 1995–1998)
 Hemignathus hanapepe – Kauaʻi nukupuʻu (extinct, 1998)
 Hemignathus lucidus – Oʻahu nukupuʻu (extinct, 1837)
 Hemignathus vorpalis James & Olson, 2003 – giant nukupu'u (prehistoric)
 Hemignathus wilsoni Rothschild, 1893 – ʻakiapolaʻau
 Genus Himatione Olson & James, 1991– thin-billed, nectarivorous
 Himatione sanguinea Gmelin, 1788 – ʻapapane
 Himatione fraithii – Laysan honeycreeper (extinct, 1923)
 Genus Loxioides Oustalet, 1877 – finch-like, Fabales seed specialists
 Loxioides bailleui Oustalet, 1877 – palila
 Loxioides kikuichi Olson & James, 2006 – Kaua'i palila (prehistoric, possibly survived to the early 18th century)
 Genus Loxops – small pointed bills with the tips slightly crossed, insectivorous
 Loxops caeruleirostris Wilson, 1890 – ‘akeke‘e
 Loxops coccineus Gmelin, 1789 – Hawaiʻi ʻakepa
 Loxops ochraceus Rothschild, 1893 - Maui ʻakepa (extinct, 1988)
 Loxops wolstenholmei Rothschild, 1895 – Oʻahu ʻakepa (extinct, 1990s)
 Loxops mana Wilson, 1891 – Hawaiʻi creeper
 Genus Magumma - small pointed bills, insectivorous and nectarivorous
 Magumma parva Stejneger, 1887 - ʻanianiau
 Genus Melamprosops Casey & Jacobi, 1974 – short pointed bill, insectivorous and snail specialist
 Melamprosops phaeosoma Casey & Jacobi, 1974 – poʻouli (possibly extinct, November 28, 2004?)
 Genus Oreomystis Wilson, 1891 – short pointed bills, insectivorous
 Oreomystis bairdi Stejneger, 1887 – ʻakikiki
 Genus Orthiospiza – large weak bill, possibly soft seed or fruit specialist?
 Orthiospiza howarthi James & Olson, 1991 - highland finch (prehistoric)
 Genus Palmeria Rothschild, 1893 – thin-billed, nectarivorous, favors Metrosideros polymorpha Palmeria dolei Wilson, 1891 – ʻākohekohe
 Genus Paroreomyza – short pointed bills, insectivorous
 Paroreomyza maculata Cabanis, 1850 – Oʻahu ʻalauahio (possibly extinct, early 1990s?)
 Paroreomyza flammea (Wilson, 1889) – kākāwahie (extinct, 1963)
 Paroreomyza montana Paroreomyza montana montana Wilson, 1890 – Lana'i 'alauahio (extinct, 1937)
 Paroreomyza montana newtoni (Rothschild, 1893) – Maui ‘alauahio
 Genus Pseudonestor – parrot-like bill, probes wood for insect larvae
 Pseudonestor xanthophrys Rothschild, 1893 – Maui parrotbill or kiwikiu
 Genus Psittirostra – slightly hooked bill, Freycinetia arborea fruit specialist
 Psittirostra psittacea Gmelin, 1789 – ʻōʻū (probably extinct, 1998?)
 Genus Rhodacanthis – large-billed, granivorous, legume specialists
 Rhodacanthis flaviceps Rothschild, 1892 – lesser koa-finch (extinct, 1891)
 Rhodacanthis forfex James & Olson, 2005 – scissor-billed koa-finch (prehistoric)
 Rhodacanthis litotes James & Olson, 2005 – primitive koa-finch (prehistoric)
 Rhodacanthis palmeri Rothschild, 1892 – greater koa-finch (extinct, 1896)
 Genus Telespiza Wilson, 1890 – finch-like, granivorous, opportunistic scavengers
 Telespiza cantans Wilson, 1890 – Laysan finch
 Telespiza persecutrix James & Olson, 1991 – Kauaʻi finch (prehistoric)
 Telespiza ultima Bryan, 1917 – Nihoa finch
 Telespiza ypsilon James & Olson, 1991 – Maui Nui finch (prehistoric)
 Genus Vangulifer – flat rounded bills, possibly caught flying insects
 Vangulifer mirandus – strange-billed finch (prehistoric)
 Vangulifer neophasis – thin-billed finch (prehistoric)
 Genus Viridonia Viridonia sagittirostris Rothschild, 1892 – greater ʻamakihi (extinct, 1901)
 Genus Xestospiza James & Oslon, 1991 – cone-shaped bills, possibly insectivores
 Xestospiza conica James & Olson, 1991 – cone-billed finch (prehistoric)
 Xestospiza fastigialis'' James & Olson, 1991 – ridge-billed finch (prehistoric)

References

 
 

Bird tribes
Carduelinae
Endemic fauna of Hawaii
Higher-level bird taxa restricted to the Australasia-Pacific region